O'Brate Stadium is a baseball park in Stillwater, Oklahoma. The home field of the Oklahoma State University Cowboys college baseball team, it is named after Cecil O'Brate. It was scheduled to host its first game on March 20, 2020 against TCU. Former President George W. Bush was scheduled to throw out the first pitch. On March 13, 2020, the baseball season ended when the Big 12 announced that all spring sports were canceled due to COVID-19 concerns, postponing the opening until February 24, 2021.

References

External links
 O'Brate Stadium website
 O'Brate Stadium construction website

Oklahoma State Cowboys baseball
College baseball venues in the United States
Baseball venues in Oklahoma
Buildings and structures in Stillwater, Oklahoma
Sports venues completed in 2020